Far-left politics, also known as the radical left or extreme left, are politics further to the left on the left–right political spectrum than the standard political left. The term does not have a single, coherent definition; some scholars consider it to represent the left of social democracy, while others limit it to the left of communist parties. In certain instances—especially in the news media—far left has been associated with some forms of authoritarianism, anarchism, communism, and Marxism, or are characterized as groups that advocate for revolutionary socialism and related communist ideologies, or anti-capitalism and anti-globalization. Far-left terrorism consists of extremist, militant, or insurgent groups that attempt to realize their ideals through political violence rather than using parliamentary processes. In the 20th century, extremist far-left politics have motivated political violence, radicalization, genocide, terrorism, sabotage and damage to property, the formation of militant organizations, political repression, conspiracism, xenophobia, and nationalism.

Definition 
The definition of the far left varies in the literature and there is not a general agreement on what it entails or consensus on the core characteristics that constitute the far left, other than being to the left of the political left. In France, extrême-gauche ("extreme left") is a generally accepted term for political groups that position themselves to the left of the Socialist Party, although some like political scientist Serge Cosseron limit the scope to the left of the French Communist Party.

Scholars, such as Luke March and Cas Mudde, propose that socio-economic rights are at the far left's core. Moreover, March and Mudde argue that the far left is to the left of the political left with regard to how parties or groups describe economic inequality on the base of existing social and political arrangements. March, a lecturer in Soviet and post-Soviet politics at the University of Edinburgh, defines the far left as those who position themselves to the left of social democracy, which is seen as either insufficiently left-wing, or as defending the social democratic tradition that is perceived to have been lost.

The two main sub-types of far-left politics are called "the radical left" and "the extreme left". The first desires fundamental changes in neoliberal capitalism and progressive reform of democracy such as direct democracy and the inclusion of marginalized communities, while the latter denounces liberal democracy as a "compromise with bourgeois political forces" and defines capitalism more strictly. Far-left politics is seen as radical politics because it calls for fundamental change to the capitalist socio-economic structure of society.

March and Mudde say that far-left parties are an increasingly stabilized political actor and are challenging mainstream social democratic parties, defining other core characteristics of far-left politics as being internationalism and a focus on networking and solidarity, as well as opposition to globalization and neoliberalism. In his later conceptualization, March started to refer to far-left politics as "radical left politics", which is constituted of radical left parties that reject the socio-economic structures of contemporary society that are based on the principles and values of capitalism.

Radical left parties 
In Europe, the support for far-left politics comes from three overlapping groups, namely far-left subcultures, disaffected social democrats, and protest voters—those who are opposed to their country's European Union membership. To distinguish the far left from the moderate left, Luke March and Cas Mudde identify three useful criteria:
 Firstly, the far left rejects the underlying socio-economic structure of contemporary capitalism.
 Secondly, they advocate alternative economic and power structures that involve the redistribution of income and wealth from political elites.
 Thirdly, they are internationalists, seeing a causality between imperialism and globalization, and regional socio-economic issues.

Other scholars classify the far left under the category of populist socialist parties. Vít Hloušek and Lubomír Kopeček of the Masaryk University at the International Institute of Political Science suggest secondary characteristics, including anti-Americanism, anti-globalization, opposition to NATO, and in some cases a rejection of European integration.

March states that "compared with the international communist movement 30 years ago, the far left has undergone a process of profound de-radicalization. The extreme left is marginal in most places." March identifies four major subgroups within contemporary European far-left politics, namely communists, democratic socialists, populist socialists, and social populists. In a later conception of far-left politics, March writes: "I prefer the term 'radical left' to alternatives such as 'hard left' and 'far left', which can appear pejorative and imply that the left is necessarily marginal." According to March, the most successful far-left parties are pragmatic and non-ideological.

According to political scientist Paolo Chiocchetti, radical left parties have failed to concretize an alternative to neoliberalism and lead a paradigm shift towards a different path of development model, despite electoral gains in the 2010s; when they were in government, such parties were forced to put aside their strong anti-neoliberalism and accept neoliberal policies, either proposed by their larger allies or imposed due to the international context. This view is also shared by Mudde, as well as political scientist Yiannos Katsourides, in regards to SYRIZA. Historian Gary Gerstle writes that in the neoliberal era, with the Fall of Communism, the globalization of capitalism, and the end of any imperative for compromise between the capitalist class and the workers in the Western world, the far left has been rendered largely powerless and no longer feared by ruling elites.

Far-left militants and terrorism 

Many far-left militant organizations were formed by members of existing political parties in the 1960s and 1970s, among them the CPI (Maoist), Montoneros, New People's Army, Prima Linea, the Red Army Faction, and the Red Brigades. These groups generally aimed to overthrow capitalism and the wealthy ruling classes. In the Years of Lead in Italy, far-left militants justified the usage of political violence as a revolutionary means and defense against far-right terrorism and neo-fascism in Italy.

See also 
 Anti-Stalinist left
 Autonomism
 Centrist Marxism
 Council communism
 Hard left
 Horseshoe theory
 Left communism
 List of anti-capitalist and communist parties with national parliamentary representation
 Radical left
 Third camp
 Ultra-leftism

References

Bibliography

Further reading

General

Radical left parties case studies

Radical left and radical right

Terrorism

External links 
 

 
Political spectrum
Political terminology